Safiqur Rahman Kiran is a Bangladesh Nationalist Party politician and a member of parliament from Shariatpur-3.

Career
Kiran was elected to parliament from Shariatpur-3 as an Bangladesh Nationalist Party candidate on 15 February 1996. He is a former president of Shariatpur District unit of Bangladesh Nationalist Party. His rivalry with Jamal Sharif Hiru divided the district unit in to two fractions. He is a member of the central executive committee of Bangladesh Nationalist Party.

References

Bangladesh Nationalist Party politicians
Date of birth missing (living people)
6th Jatiya Sangsad members
People from Shariatpur District